Mor Julius Yeshu Cicek (born Julius Yeshu Çiçek; 1 January 1942 in Kafro `Elayto, Tur Abdin, Turkey – died 29 October 2005 in Düsseldorf, Germany) was the first Syriac Orthodox Church archbishop for Central Europe. In his book Mardutho d Suryoye, he advocated an Aramean identity. He wrote over one hundred works, some of them in Aramaic.

Life
Julius Yeshu Çiçek was the son of the Syriac Orthodox priest Barsaumo (1908 - 1993) and his wife Bath Qyomo Sayde († 1991). At age nine, he went to the seminary of Deyr-ul-Za'faran, where he studied Syriac, Turkish, Arabic and theology. After 1958 he was ordained as a deacon and secretary of the later metropolitan Mor Philoxenos Yuhanon Dolabani. Later, he entered the monastery of Mor Cyriacus in the region Bsheriye (Bitlis) and became involved in the search of surviving Syriac and Armenian Christians after the 1915 genocide.

In 1960, he became a novice in the monastery of Mor Gabriel and taught there at the theological seminary. Yeshu Çiçek was elected abbot and in 1969 he was ordained as Bishop of Tur Abdin by Mor Iwannis Ephrem Bilgic. After living in Damascus at the Seminary of Mor Ephrem at Atshane in Lebanon, and in the Holy Land, he came to Germany. After a layover in 1975 - 1977 in the United States, on the advice of the local Metropolitan Mar Samuel he returned to Europe, to Hengelo. In 1977 the Holy Synod  elected him  patriarchal vicar for the Diocese of Central and Eastern Europe. He built a hall for a new Syriac Orthodox church of St. John the Evangelist, later consecrated by the Patriarch Ignatius Jacob III.

On 24 June 1979 Patriarch Jacob III consecrated him with the name Mor Julius. In 1984, Mor Julius bought the former Catholic monastery of St. Ephrem in Losser, Netherlands, and established it as the seat of the Archbishop. The church had three large monasteries near Enschede in the Netherlands, in Arth in Switzerland and in Warburg in Germany. In the monasteries he founded, he built schools and trained clerics in the tradition of their church.

Mor Julius published significant scientific contributions to the Church in Bar Hebraeus-Verlag, which published more than 100 books related to the Syrian Orthodox liturgy, Bible, history, etc. in Syriac and in European languages.

Mor Julius participated in ecumenical dialogues with the Catholic Church in the Pro Oriente and accompanied Patriarch Ignatius Zakka I Iwas during his historic visit to Rome in 1984, where a Joint Declaration with Pope John Paul II was signed.

References

External links 

 Biography of Julius Yeshu Çiçek
 books published by Julius Yeshu Çiçek

1942 births
Syriac Orthodox Church bishops
Oriental Orthodoxy in Europe
Oriental Orthodoxy in Germany
Turkish Oriental Orthodox Christians
2005 deaths
Tur Abdin